Berqayel or Berkayel is one of the largest and the most historical towns in Akkar Governorate in northern Lebanon. Berkail is about 25 km north Tripoli. Berkail is well known by its olive production and green fields. It is a Sunni Muslim community.

History
In 1838, Eli Smith noted  the village,  whose inhabitants were Sunni Muslim, located west of esh-Sheikh Mohammed.

Economy 
Much of Berkail's population is employed by the Lebanese Army. Olives are the main agricultural product.

References

Bibliography

External links
Berqayel, Localiban 

Populated places in Akkar District
Sunni Muslim communities in Lebanon